The 2017 Lithuanian Football Cup, also known as LFF Cup, was the seventy-second season of the Lithuanian annual football knock-out tournament. Forty-four teams entered the competitions, which started on 27 April and ended on 24 September in Aukštaitija Stadium, Panevėžys.

Stumbras defeated defending champions Žalgiris 1–0 in the final and have qualified for the first qualifying round of the 2018–19 UEFA Europa League.

Participants
Participation in the competition was mandatory for all clubs of the first three tiers (A Lyga, LFF I Lyga and II Lyga). Despite that two II Lyga sides - NFA and Šiauliai FA weren't competing. Teams of lower divisions were eligible to join if they met additional criterios. Rules prevented all reserve teams from entering the cup.

{| class="wikitable" style="text-align:left"
|-
!width=140|A Lyga
!width=140|LFF I Lyga
!II Lyga
!width=140|III Lyga
!IV Lyga
!Other
|-
|valign=top|
Žalgiris (holders)
Trakai
Sūduva
Atlantas
Stumbras
Jonava
Utenis
Kauno Žalgiris
|valign=top|
Banga
Pakruojis
Palanga
Panevėžys
Nevėžis
Šilutė
Koralas
Džiugas
Tauras
Vilniaus Vytis
DFK Dainava
|valign=top|
South Zone
Panerys
Hegelmann Litauen
TERA
Viltis
Sveikata
Šilas
West Zone
Babrungas
Širvėna
Gargždų Pramogos SC
Juventa-99
Akmenės Cementas
Atmosfera
Minija
|valign=top|
Kaunas County
Kėdainiai
LŠS
Garliava
Prienai
Marijampolė County
Švyturys
Klaipėda County
Sendvaris
Šiauliai County
Saulininkas-OBLT
Adiada
Fanai
|valign=top|
A Division
Elektrėnų Versmė
D Division
Geležinis Vilkas
|valign=top|
Veterans League
Prelegentai
|}

Schedule

The rounds of the 2016–17 competition were scheduled as follows:

Matches

First round
The following pairs were drawn on 18 April 2017 by famous TV personality Paulius Ambrazevičius and all-time most capped Lithuanian national team player Andrius Skerla. Dates and venues were confirmed after the draw.

Džiugas, Šilutė, Tauras, Koralas (I Lyga), Hegelmann Litauen, TERA, Viltis, Panerys (II Lyga), Adiada, Kėdainiai, Saulininkas-OBLT (III Lyga) and Prelegentai (Veterans League) received free passes to the next round.

Round of 32
The following pairs were drawn on 16 May 2017 by TV personality Paulius Ambrazevičius. Dates and venues were confirmed after the draw.

Round of 16
The following pairs were drawn on 30 May 2017. Dates and venues were confirmed after the draw.

Quarter-finals
The following pairs were drawn on 27 June 2017 by Lithuania national team midfielder Vykintas Slivka. Dates and venues were confirmed after the draw.

Semi-finals
The following pairs were drawn on 30 August 2017 by actor Andrius Bialobžeskis along with Lithuania national team players Emilijus Zubas and Linas Klimavičius. Dates and venues were confirmed after the draw.

Final
The final match was played on Sunday 24 September 2017 at Aukštaitija Stadium in Panevėžys.

See also

Leagues
 2017 A Lyga
 2017 LFF I Lyga

Cups
 2017 Lithuanian Supercup

Notes

References

2017
Cup
2016–17 European domestic association football cups
2017–18 European domestic association football cups